Templebryan Stone Circle (also known as The Druid's Temple) is a stone circle, located  north of Clonakilty, County Cork, Ireland. Grid ref: W386 438. Close by lies an Early Christian site.

See also
 List of megalithic monuments in Cork

References

External links

Megalithics - Templebryan Recumbent Stone Circle - Co. Cork
Megalithomania - Templebryan Stone Circle

Stone circles in Ireland
Archaeological sites in County Cork